Aiseau-Presles is a municipality of Wallonia located in the province of Hainaut, Belgium. 

On 1 January 2018 Aiseau-Presles had a total population of 10,788. The total area is 22.19 km² which gives a population density of 486 inhabitants per km². It is located in the arrondissement of Charleroi. Its postal area is: 6250.

Cities and municipalities bordering: Châtelet - Farciennes - Fosses-la-Ville - Gerpinnes - Sambreville.

Districts

Aiseau
Pont-de-Loup
Presles
Roselies

Landmarks
Oignies Abbey

Demographics
Historical population:
1977: 10,969
1994: 10,912

References

External links
 
Aiseau-Presles website

Municipalities of Hainaut (province)